Biasmia antennalis is a species of beetle in the family Cerambycidae. It was described by Hunt and Breuning in 1957. It is known from South Africa and Zimbabwe.

References

Crossotini
Beetles described in 1957